Laura Vaccaro Seeger is an American author and artist of children's books, for which she has often appeared on the New York Times Bestseller List and won the Caldecott Honor twice, the New York Times Best Illustrated Book Award, the Boston Globe-Horn Book Award for Best Picture Book, the Empire State Award for "Body of Work and Contribution to Children’s Literature", the Massachusetts Reading Association Award for "Body of Work and Contribution to Children's Literature", and the Theodor Seuss Geisel Honor twice.

Career
Seeger earned her BFA degree at the School of Fine Art and Design at the State University of New York at Purchase SUNY Purchase in Westchester, New York. She began a career as an animator, artist, designer and editor in the network television business. She created show openings and special segments for NBC and ABC for many years and won an Emmy Award for an NBC Special opening animation.

Paintings created by Seeger have been displayed at the Art Institute of Chicago, Eric Carle Museum of Picture Book Art, Mazza Museum, New York Public Library, and Nassu County Museum of Art.

Personal life
Seeger lives in Rockville Centre, Long Island, with her husband, Chris Arley Seeger, their two sons.

Books 
Why?, 2019
Blue, 2018
Bear in the Chair, 2017
Dog Changes His Name, 2017
I Used to be Afraid, 2015
Dog and Bear - Tricks and Treats, 2014
Bully, 2013
Green, 2012
What if?, 2010
Dog and Bear - Three to Get Ready, 2009
Dog and Bear - Two's Company, 2008
One Boy, 2008
First the Egg, 2007
Dog and Bear - Two Friends, Three Stories, 2007
Black? White! Day? Night! - A Book of Opposites, 2006
Walter Was Worried, 2005
Lemons Are Not Red,  2004
The Hidden Alphabet, 2003
I Had a Rooster, 2001

Awards 
Massachusetts Reading Association Award for Body of Work and Contribution to Children'Literature - 2014
ALA Notable Book, 2004-2009 and 2014
Caldecott Honor Book, 2013
New York Empire State Award for Body of Work and Contribution to Children'Literature - 2011
School Library Journal Best Book, 2010
Bank Street College of Education Best Book, 2010
 Theodor Seuss Geisel Honor Book, 2009
NCTE Notable Children's Book in Language Arts, 2009
Publishers Weekly Best Book, 2008
Caldecott Honor Book, 2008 
Theodor Seuss Geisel Honor Book, 2008
New York Times Best Illustrated Book of 2007
New York Times Best Seller]
Horn Book Fanfare Best Book of 2007
Oppenheim Platinum Award, 2008 
Boston Globe-Horn Book Award Winner for Best Picture Book, 2007
Publishers Weekly Best Book, 2007
Child Magazine Best Book, 2004-2006
Nick Jr./Family Magazine Best Book, 2006
Booklist Editor's Choice, 2007-2008
 IRA Children's Choice Best Book, 2006
 New York Public Library Best Book, 2003-2004 and 2007-2008
 NBC Today Show Best Book for Gift Giving, 2003

References

External links 
 
 

Living people
American people of Italian descent
American children's book illustrators
American children's writers
Writers who illustrated their own writing
Year of birth missing (living people)
Place of birth missing (living people)